Acacia ericksoniae is a shrub belonging to the genus Acacia and the subgenus Phyllodineae that is native to Western Australia.

Description
The slender, straight, erect and often spinescent branchlets often have stellate hairs. The green phyllodes have an inequilaterally obtriangular shape with the upper margin forming a rounded angle and the lower margin shallowly convex. It blooms from June to September and produces yellow flowers.

Taxonomy
The species was first formally described by the botanist Bruce Maslin in 1999 as part of the work Acacia miscellany 16. The taxonomy of fifty-five species of Acacia, primarily Western Australian, in section Phyllodineae (Leguminosae: Mimosoideae) as published in the journal Nuytsia. The species was reclassified in 2003 as Racosperma ericksonaie by Leslie Pedley and transferred back to the genus Acacia in 2011. It is often identified as Acacia bidentata

Distribution
It is endemic to an area in the Mid West and Wheatbelt regions of Western Australia where it is found on sand plains growing in sandy or loamy soils over or around granite or laterite.

See also
List of Acacia species

References

ericksoniae
Acacias of Western Australia
Plants described in 1999
Taxa named by Bruce Maslin